Montuori is an Italian surname. Notable people with the surname include:

Carlo Montuori (1885–1968), Italian cinematographer
Luca Montuori (1859–1952), Italian general
Mario Montuori (born 1920), Italian cinematographer
Miguel Montuori (1932–1998), Italian-Argentine footballer
Nancy Montuori Stein, American film director and producer

Italian-language surnames